Joseph Bruce Ismay (12 December 1862 – 17 October 1937) was an English businessman who served as chairman and managing director of the White Star Line. In 1912, he came to international attention as the highest-ranking White Star official to survive the sinking of the company's new flagship , for which he was subject to severe criticism.

Early life
Ismay was born in Crosby, Lancashire. He was the son of Thomas Henry Ismay (7 January 1837 – 23 November 1899) and Margaret Bruce (13 April 1837 – 9 April 1907), daughter of ship-owner Luke Bruce. Thomas Ismay was the senior partner in Ismay, Imrie and Company and the founder of the White Star Line. The younger Ismay was educated at Elstree School and Harrow, then tutored in France for a year. He was apprenticed at his father's office for 4 years, after which he toured the world. He then went to New York City as the company representative, eventually rising to the rank of agent. Bruce was one of the founding team of Liverpool Ramblers football club in 1882.

On 4 December 1888, Ismay married Julia Florence Schieffelin (5 March 1867 – 31 December 1963), daughter of George Richard Schieffelin and Julia Matilda Delaplaine of New York, with whom he had five children:
 Margaret Bruce Ismay (29 December 1889 – 15 May 1967), who married George Ronald Hamilton Cheape (1881–1957) in 1912
 Henry Bruce Ismay (3 April 1891 – 1 October 1891)
 Thomas Bruce Ismay (18 February 1894 – 27 April 1954), who married Jane Margaret Seymour, a daughter of Walter Seymour of Ballymore Castle, Co. Galway, Ireland, in 1922.
 Evelyn Constance Ismay (17 July 1897 – 9 August 1940), who married Basil Sanderson (1894–1971) in 1927
 George Bruce Ismay (6 June 1902 – 30 April 1943), who married Florence Victoria Edrington in 1926.

In 1891, Ismay returned with his family to the United Kingdom and became a partner in his father's firm, Ismay, Imrie and Company. In 1899, Thomas Ismay died, and Bruce Ismay became head of the family business. Ismay had a head for business, and the White Star Line flourished under his leadership. In addition to running his ship business, Ismay also served as a director of several other companies. In 1901, he was approached by Americans who wished to build an international shipping conglomerate (the International Mercantile Marine Company) to which Ismay agreed to sell his firm.

Chairman of the White Star Line 
After the death of his father on 23 November 1899, Bruce Ismay succeeded him as the chairman of the White Star Line. These vessels were designed more for size and luxury than for speed.

In 1902, Ismay oversaw the sale of the White Star Line to J.P. Morgan & Co., which was organising the formation of International Mercantile Marine Company, an Atlantic shipping combine which absorbed several major American and British lines. IMM was a holding company that controlled subsidiary operating corporations. Morgan hoped to dominate transatlantic shipping through interlocking directorates and contractual arrangements with the railroads, but that proved impossible because of the unscheduled nature of sea transport, American antitrust legislation, and an agreement with the British government. White Star Line became one of the IMM operating companies and, in February 1904, Ismay became president of the IMM, with the support of Morgan.

RMS Titanic 

Ismay's new type of ship would not be as fast as their competitors, but it would have huge steerage capacity and luxury unparalleled in the history of ocean-going steamships. The latter feature was largely meant to attract the wealthy and the prosperous middle class. They were in order ,  and RMS (later HMHS) . In a move that would become highly controversial, during construction of the first two Olympic-class liners, Ismay authorised the projected number of lifeboats reduced from 48 to 16, the latter being the minimum allowed by the Board of Trade, based on the 's tonnage.

Ismay occasionally accompanied his ships on their maiden voyages, and this was the case with the Titanic. During the voyage, Ismay talked with either (or possibly both) chief engineer Joseph Bell or Captain Edward J. Smith about a possible test of speed if time permitted. After the ship collided with an iceberg 400 miles south of the Grand Banks of Newfoundland on the night of 14 April 1912, it became clear that it would sink long before any rescue ships could arrive. Ismay stepped aboard Collapsible C, which was launched less than 20 minutes before the ship went down. He later testified that as the ship was in her final moments, he turned away, unable to watch. Collapsible C was picked up by the Carpathia about 3–4 hours later.

After being picked up by the Carpathia, Ismay was led to the cabin belonging to the ship's doctor, Frank Mcgee. He gave Captain Rostron a message to send to White Star's New York office: 
Ismay did not leave Mcgee's cabin for the entire journey, ate nothing solid, and was kept under the influence of opiates. Another survivor, 17-year-old Jack Thayer, visited Ismay to try to console him, despite having just lost his father in the sinking.

When he arrived in New York, Ismay was hosted by Philip Franklin, vice president of the company. He was summoned by and testified before a Senate committee hearing headed by Republican Senator William Alden Smith the day after the sinking. A few weeks later, Ismay also testified at the British Board of Trade inquiry (chaired by Lord Mersey).

Criticism

After the disaster, Ismay was savaged by both the American and the British press for deserting the ship while women and children were still on board. Some papers called him the "Coward of the Titanic" or "J. Brute Ismay", and suggested that the White Star flag be changed to a yellow liver. Some ran negative cartoons depicting him deserting the ship. The writer Ben Hecht, then a young newspaperman in Chicago, wrote a scathing poem contrasting the actions of Captain Smith and Ismay. The final verse reads: "To hold your place in the ghastly face / of death on the sea at night / is a seaman's job, but to flee with the mob / is an owner's noble right."

Some maintain Ismay followed the "women and children first" principle, having assisted many women and children himself. Ismay's actions were defended in the official British inquiry, which found "Mr. Ismay, after rendering assistance to many passengers, found "C" collapsible, the last boat on the starboard side, actually being lowered. No other people were there at the time. There was room for him and he jumped in. Had he not jumped in he would merely have added one more life—namely, his own—to the number of those lost."

Ismay had boarded Collapsible C with first-class passenger William Carter; both said they did so after there were no more women and children near that particular lifeboat. Carter's own behaviour and reliability, however, were criticised by Mrs. Lucile Carter, who sued him for divorce in 1914; she testified Carter had left her and their children to fend for themselves after the collision and accused him of "cruel and barbarous treatment and indignities to the person". London society ostracised Ismay and labelled him a coward. On 30 June 1913, Ismay resigned as president of International Mercantile Marine and chairman of the White Star Line, to be succeeded by Harold Sanderson.

Ismay announced during the United States Inquiry that all the vessels of the International Mercantile Marine Company would be equipped with lifeboats in sufficient numbers for all passengers. Following the inquiry, Ismay and the surviving officers of the ship returned to England aboard .

Titanic controversy 
During the congressional investigations, some passengers testified that during the voyage they heard Ismay pressuring Captain Smith to increase the speed of the Titanic in order to arrive in New York ahead of schedule and generate some free press about the new liner. The book The White Star Line: An Illustrated History (2000) by Paul Louden-Brown states that this was unlikely, and that Ismay's record does not support the notion that he had any motive to do so.

Writing on the BBC News magazine website, Rosie Waites reports that Ismay was widely vilified in the United States after the sinking of the Titanic due to the hostility shown in the yellow press controlled by William Randolph Hearst, who had fallen out with Ismay. Waites writes "Ismay was almost universally condemned in America, where the Hearst syndicated press ran a vitriolic campaign against him, labelling him 'J. Brute Ismay'. It published lists of all those who died but in the column of those saved it had just one name – Ismay's."

Following from the Hearst press depiction of Ismay, Waites writes that every subsequent film about the Titanic has depicted Ismay as a villain, starting with the 1943 Nazi propaganda film Titanic where he is depicted as a corrupt British businessman who forces Captain Smith to sail Titanic recklessly at full speed into ice-infested waters in order to set a transatlantic speed record. A similar portrayal followed in the 1996 miniseries Titanic. In James Cameron's 1997 film, Ismay is often villainized due to the film's inclusion of a scene based on the eyewitness account of First Class passenger, Elizabeth Lines, who after the sinking, stated in a deposition that she overheard Ismay urging Captain Smith to arrive in New York ahead of schedule in order to beat the transatlantic crossing time of Titanic sister, . The scene takes place in the exact location, day, and time that Lines recalled overhearing Ismay and Smith's alleged conversation, with the character of Elizabeth Lines seen in the background, but does not specify it is the Olympic crossing time that Ismay is hoping to beat. Over the years, Lines account has been questioned by historians with some expressing doubt that it occurred. Louden-Brown, one of several consultants to the Cameron film, has stated that he thought the antagonistic characterization of Ismay was unfair, and he tried to challenge this, but regardless of Louden-Brown's opinions, it was included in the film. Louden-Brown said, "Apart from being told, under no circumstances are we prepared to adjust the script, one thing they also said is 'this is what the public expect to see'." Additionally, Julian Fellowes' 2012 miniseries Titanic, depicts Ismay as a bigot who orders a group of non-British crew members locked below to drown during the sinking. A Titanic-themed episode of the science fiction television series Voyagers! portrayed Ismay dressing as a woman in order to sneak into a lifeboat.

Lord Mersey, who led the 1912 British inquiry into the sinking of the Titanic, concluded that Ismay had helped many other passengers before finding a place for himself on the last lifeboat to leave the starboard side.

Later life 
Though cleared of blame by the official British inquiry, Ismay never recovered from the Titanic disaster. Already emotionally repressed and insecure before his voyage on Titanic, the tragedy sent him into a state of deep depression from which he never truly emerged. He kept a low profile afterwards. He lived part of the year in a large cottage, Costelloe Lodge, in the townland of Derrynea (near Casla) in Connemara, County Galway, Ireland which he bought from Henry Rudolph Laing of Cadogan Gardens, London, in January 1913, less than a year after the sinking. The purchase also included the fishing rights for the river and lake adjoining it. Paul Louden-Brown, in his history of the White Star Line, writes that Ismay continued to be active in business, and that much of his work was for The Liverpool & London Steamship Protection & Indemnity Association Limited, an insurance company founded by his father. According to Louden-Brown:

Ismay maintained an interest in maritime affairs. He inaugurated a cadet ship called Mersey used to train officers for Britain's Merchant Navy, donated £11,000 to start a fund for lost seamen, and in 1919 gave £25,000 (approximately equivalent to £ in ) to set up a fund to recognise the contribution of merchant mariners in the First World War.

After the tragedy, Ismay's wife Florence ensured the subject of Titanic was never again discussed within the family. His granddaughter, historian and author Pauline Matarasso, likened her grandfather to a "corpse" in his later years:

In his personal life, Ismay became a man of solitary habits, spending his summers at his Connemara cottage and indulging in a love of trout and salmon fishing. When in Liverpool, he would attend concerts by himself at St George's Hall or visit a cinema, at other times wandering through the Liverpool parks and engaging transients in conversation. A family friend observed the spectre of Titanic was never far from Ismay's thoughts, saying that he continually "tormented himself with useless speculation as to how the disaster could possibly have been avoided." At a Christmastime family gathering in 1936, less than a year before Ismay's death, one of his grandsons by his daughter Evelyn, who had learned Ismay had been involved in maritime shipping, enquired if his grandfather had ever been shipwrecked. Ismay finally broke his quarter-century silence on the tragedy that had blighted his life, replying: "Yes, I was once in a ship which was believed to be unsinkable."

Death

Ismay's health declined in the 1930s, following a diagnosis of diabetes, which worsened in early 1936 when the illness resulted in the amputation of his right leg below the knee. He was subsequently largely confined to a wheelchair. On the morning of 14 October 1937, he collapsed in his bedroom at his residence in Mayfair, London, after suffering a massive stroke, which left him unconscious, blind and mute. Three days later, on 17 October, J. Bruce Ismay died at the age of 74.

Ismay's funeral was held at St Paul's Church, Knightsbridge, on 21 October 1937, and he is buried in Putney Vale Cemetery, London. He left a very considerable personal estate, which, excluding property, was valued at £693,305 (approximately equivalent to £ in ). In March 1939, his wife Florence conveyed the property in Connemara unto their son George Bruce Ismay (including the fishery rights extending from the sea to the Lake of Glenicmurrin via the River Casla). After his death, Florence renounced her British subject status in order to restore her American citizenship on 14 November 1949.

Julia Florence Ismay, née Schieffelin, died 31 December 1963, aged 96, in Kensington, London.

Portrayals 
 Ernst Fritz Fürbringer (1943) (Titanic)
 Lowell Gilmore (1955) (You Are There: The Sinking of the Titanic (TV episode, 22 May 1955)
 Frank Lawton (1958) (A Night to Remember)
 Ian Holm (1979) (S.O.S. Titanic) (TV film)
 Sam Chew, Jr. (1982) (Voyagers!) (Voyagers of the Titanic)
 Roger Rees (1996) (Titanic) (TV miniseries/2 parts)
 Jonathan Hyde (1997) (Titanic) (Film)
 David Garrison (1997) (Titanic) (Broadway musical)
 David Haines (2006) (Titanic) (Broadway musical – Canadian premiere)
 Eric Braeden (1999) (The Titanic Chronicles) (TV documentary)
 Ken Marschall (2003) (Ghosts of the Abyss) (Documentary)
 Christopher Wright (2005) (Titanic: Birth of a Legend) (TV documentary)
 Mark Tandy (2008) (The Unsinkable Titanic) (TV documentary)
 Christopher Villiers (2011) (The Curiosity: What Sank Titanic?) (TV series)
 James Wilby (2012) (Titanic) (TV series/4 episodes)
 Gray O'Brien (2012) (Titanic: Blood and Steel) (TV series/12 episodes)
 Julien Ball (2012) (Iceberg – Right Ahead!) (London stage play)
 Michael Maloney (2012) (Sherlock Holmes: The Adventure of the Perfidious Mariner) (audio play)
 Derek Mahon ("After the Titanic") (poem)

See also
Passengers of the RMS Titanic

Notes

References 
Citations

Sources

Further reading

External links 
 J. Bruce Ismay at Encyclopedia Titanica
 Article on Ismay and the Titanic

1862 births
1937 deaths
People educated at Elstree School
People educated at Harrow School
RMS Titanic's crew and passengers
British racehorse owners and breeders
People from Crosby, Merseyside
Burials at Putney Vale Cemetery
Businesspeople from Liverpool
British businesspeople in shipping
People with diabetes
Liverpool Ramblers F.C. players
Directors of the London and North Western Railway
White Star Line
RMS Titanic survivors
Association footballers not categorized by position
English footballers